Nueva Rosita is a town in the northeastern part of the state of Coahuila in northern Mexico.

In 1990 the town was recorded as having a population of 36,284. The town was initially developed in the 1930s. It remains today an important manufacturing centre for the north of Mexico.

The area is the site of a coal mine owned by Grupo México. On February 19, 2006, an explosion occurred in the mine, trapping more than 60 miners underground.

Demographics
The census of 2005 reported a population of 40,115 for the municipality of San Juan de Sabinas, of whom 36,639 lived in the community of Nueva Rosita. The municipality has an area of 735.4 km² (283.94 sq mi). Its second-largest town (population 1,431) is also named San Juan de Sabinas. The main ethnic group are mestizo(mixed European and Amerindian) and European.

References
Link to tables of municipios and localidades in Coahuila INEGI: Instituto Nacional de Estadística Geografia e Informatica
Coahuila Enciclopedia de los Municipios de México

External links
Portal Municipal de San Juan de Sabinas Official website of Municipality of San Juan Sabinas

Populated places in Coahuila